The Federation of Indian Fantasy Sports or FIFS is India's only self-governing body for Fantasy sport in India, based in New Delhi. They support Fantasy Sports and work towards their welfare.

FIFS was previously formed as the Indian Federation of Sports Gaming or IFSG, later changing to the Federation of Indian Fantasy Sports. The CEO of FIFS is Anwar Shirpurwala and Harsh Jain is the president and co-founder/CEO of Dream11.

History 
FIFS was founded as the Indian Federation of Sports Gaming or IFSG in 2017. They are registered under Section 8 of the Indian Companies Act, 2013. It is the only regulatory and representative body of the Fantasy Sports Industry in India. Former Judge of the Supreme Court of India, Justice Arjan Kumar Sikri was appointed as the Ombudsman and Ethics Officer.

FIFS legal 
The State of Kerala received petitions wanting a ban on fantasy gaming sites and applications. The Court studied several clauses and constitutional acts and concluded that Rummy, Card Games, Dart Throw, Ball Throw, and Shooting Contest. Similar to such games, Online Fantasy Sports also require the Game of Skill and are passed as legal, according to Section 14 (A) of 1976.

The State of Rajasthan reviewed the plea and finalized an order on online Fantasy Sports. The Court recognized Fantasy Sports as a game of skill and not betting or gambling. The 276th Law Commission Report mentions fantasy games like fantasy football as opposed to betting.

The Union Territory of Chandigarh examined the Fantasy Sport in question and dismissed the case stating the game doesn’t involve gambling.

The Bombay High Court, on 13th April 2019 also approved the usage of Fantasy Sports. The court recognized it as a legitimate business and applied the game of skill in its function.

The Supreme Court officially recognized Fantasy Sports and online fantasy in 2021. The bench mentioned Fantasy Sports as a Game of Skill involving money and does not represent any betting or gambling roles.

Some states like Assam, Sikkim, Nagaland, Adhisa, Telangana, and Andhra Pradesh have still refused to recognize Fantasy Sports, as a legally operated business.

FIFS committee members 
 Anwar Shirpurwala, CEO
 Harsh Jain, President
 Bimal Julka, Chairman
 Joy Bhattacharjya, Director General
 Justice Arjan Kumar Sikri, Ombudsman, Ethics Officer
 John Loffhagen, Member of Advisory Council
 Amrit Mathur, Member of Advisory Council
 Prof. Ratnakar Shetty, Member of Advisory Council

FIFS members 
Following is the list of FIFS member, ' fantasy sport organisations'.

See also
 Fantasy cricket
 Daily fantasy sports
 Fantasy sport in India
 Video gaming in India

References 

Sports governing bodies in India
Sports organizations established in 2017
2017 establishments in India 
Sport in India
Gaming organizations